Super Hits is a compilation album by American soft rock band Toto. It was released in 2001. The album has been repackaged under different several times, as Rosanna in 2004, as Collections in 2006 and as Toto in 2009.

Track listing 
 Hold the Line
 Rosanna
 Africa
 Georgy Porgy
 Live for Today
 99
 Without Your Love
 St. George and the Dragon
 Isolation
 I'll Be over You

References

2001 greatest hits albums
Toto (band) albums